Can-Am, or CanAm, is an abbreviation of Canadian-American. It may refer to:

CanAm Highway, an international highway connecting Canada to the United States and Mexico, extending from La Ronge, Saskatchewan to El Paso, Texas.
Can-Am Center, an international study centre for Canada-US relations at the University of Maine.
Can-Am motorcycles, motorcycle manufacturer 1971-1987
Can-Am Off-Road, revival of the motorcycle brand by Bombardier Recreational Products for motorcycles and all-terrain vehicles, 2007-date. 
The Can-Am Spyder, a three-wheeled motorcycle manufactured since 2007 by Can-Am motorcycles.

Record labels
Canadian-American Records, a record label founded in 1957 by Don Costa (future father of Nikka) and Leonard Zimmer

Sports

Auto racing
Can-Am Challenge Cup, known as "Can-Am", a former sports car racing series that ran from 1966 to 1987 in Canada and the United States.
Can-Am Speedway, a motorsports dirt track racing venue in La Fargeville, New York.

Baseball
 CanAm Association, or the "Canadian American Association of Professional Baseball", known as the modern Can-Am League. Founded in 2005. 
Can-Am Grays, a former professional independent baseball team which played in the Can-Am League from 2005 to 2008.
Canadian–American League, the original Can-Am League which operated between 1936 and 1951.

Floorball
Can-Am United Floorball Club, a team founded in 2010 to compete in the Canada Cup.

Ice Hockey
Canadian–American Hockey League, a league which operated between 1926 and 1936.

Lacrosse
Can-Am Lacrosse League, a league of the Canadian Lacrosse Association based in Southwestern Ontario and upstate New York.

Soccer
 CanAm Conference, a part of the Women's Premier Soccer League based in Southern Ontario and upstate New York.

Wrestling
The Can-Am Connection, a tag team composed of Rick Martel and Tom Zenk in the World Wrestling Federation (WWF) through 1986 and 1987.
The Can-Am Express, a tag team formed by Doug Furnas and Dan Kroffat (later replaced by Phil LaFon) that wrestled from 1989 to 1999. 
The Can-Am Wrestling School, a professional wrestling promotion training school owned by the Ontario-based Border City Wrestling.